An American in Paris is a jazz-influenced orchestral piece by American composer George Gershwin first performed in 1928.

Gershwin scored the piece for the standard instruments of the symphony orchestra plus celesta, saxophones, and automobile horns. He brought back four Parisian taxi horns for the New York premiere of the composition, which took place on December 13, 1928, in Carnegie Hall, with Walter Damrosch conducting the New York Philharmonic. It was Damrosch who had commissioned Gershwin to write his Concerto in F following the earlier success of Rhapsody in Blue (1924). He completed the orchestration on November 18, less than four weeks before the work's premiere. He collaborated on the original program notes with critic and composer Deems Taylor.

Background
Although the story is likely apocryphal, Gershwin is said to have been attracted by Maurice Ravel's unusual chords, and Gershwin went on his first trip to Paris in 1926 ready to study with Ravel. After his initial student audition with Ravel turned into a sharing of musical theories, Ravel said he could not teach him, saying, "Why be a second-rate Ravel when you can be a first-rate Gershwin?"

Gershwin strongly encouraged Ravel to come to the United States for a tour. To this end, upon his return to New York, Gershwin joined the efforts of Ravel's friend Robert Schmitz, a pianist Ravel had met during the war, to urge Ravel to tour the U.S. Schmitz was the head of Pro Musica, promoting Franco-American musical relations, and was able to offer Ravel a $10,000 fee for the tour, an enticement Gershwin knew would be important to Ravel.

Gershwin greeted Ravel in New York in March 1928 during a party held for Ravel's birthday by Éva Gauthier. Ravel's tour reignited Gershwin's desire to return to Paris, which he and his brother Ira did after meeting Ravel. Ravel's high praise of Gershwin in an introductory letter to Nadia Boulanger caused Gershwin to seriously consider taking much more time to study abroad in Paris. Yet after he played for her, she told him she could not teach him. Boulanger gave Gershwin basically the same advice she gave all her accomplished master students: "What could I give you that you haven't already got?" This did not set Gershwin back, as his real intent abroad was to complete a new work based on Paris and perhaps a second rhapsody for piano and orchestra to follow his Rhapsody in Blue. Paris at this time hosted many expatriate writers, among them Ezra Pound, W. B. Yeats, Ernest Hemingway, F. Scott Fitzgerald and artist Pablo Picasso.

Composition

Gershwin based An American in Paris on a melodic fragment called "Very Parisienne", written in 1926 on his first visit to Paris as a gift to his hosts, Robert and Mabel Schirmer. Gershwin called it "a rhapsodic ballet"; it is written freely and in a much more modern idiom than his prior works.

Gershwin explained in Musical America, "My purpose here is to portray the impressions of an American visitor in Paris as he strolls about the city, listens to the various street noises, and absorbs the French atmosphere."

The piece is structured into five sections, which culminate in a loose ABA format. Gershwin's first A episode introduces the two main "walking" themes in the "Allegretto grazioso" and develops a third theme in the "Subito con brio". The style of this A section is written in the typical French style of composers Claude Debussy and Les Six. This A section featured duple meter, singsong rhythms, and diatonic melodies with the sounds of oboe, English horn, and taxi horns. The B section's "Andante ma con ritmo deciso" introduces the American Blues and spasms of homesickness. The "Allegro" that follows continues to express homesickness in a faster twelve-bar blues. In the B section, Gershwin uses common time, syncopated rhythms, and bluesy melodies with the sounds of trumpet, saxophone, and snare drum. "Moderato con grazia" is the last A section that returns to the themes set in A. After recapitulating the "walking" themes, Gershwin overlays the slow blues theme from section B in the final "Grandioso".

Response

Gershwin did not particularly like Walter Damrosch's interpretation at the world premiere of An American in Paris. He stated that Damrosch's sluggish, dragging tempo caused him to walk out of the hall during a matinee performance of this work. The audience, according to Edward Cushing, responded with "a demonstration of enthusiasm impressively genuine in contrast to the conventional applause which new music, good and bad, ordinarily arouses."

Critics believed that An American in Paris was better crafted than Gershwin's Concerto in F. Some did not think it belonged in a program with classical composers César Franck, Richard Wagner, or Guillaume Lekeu on its premiere. Gershwin responded to the critics:

Instrumentation
An American in Paris was originally scored for 3 flutes (3rd doubling on piccolo), 2 oboes, English horn, 2 clarinets in B-flat, bass clarinet in B-flat, 2 bassoons, 4 horns in F, 3 trumpets in B-flat, 3 trombones, tuba, timpani, snare drum, bass drum, triangle, wood block, ratchet, cymbals, low and high tom-toms, xylophone, glockenspiel, celesta, 4 taxi horns labeled as A, B, C, and D with circles around them, alto saxophone, tenor saxophone, baritone saxophone (all doubling soprano and alto saxophones), and strings. Although most modern audiences have heard the taxi horns using the notes A, B, C, and D, it had been Gershwin's intention to use the notes A4, B4, D5, and A3. It is likely that in labeling the taxi horns as A, B, C, and D with circles, he was referring to the four horns, and not the notes that they played.

A major revision of the work by composer and arranger F. Campbell-Watson simplified the instrumentation by reducing the saxophones to only three instruments: alto, tenor and baritone; the soprano and alto saxophone doublings were eliminated to avoid changing instruments. This became the standard performing edition until 2000, when Gershwin specialist Jack Gibbons made his own restoration of the original orchestration of An American in Paris, working directly from Gershwin's original manuscript, including the restoration of Gershwin's soprano saxophone parts removed in Campbell-Watson's revision. Gibbons' restored orchestration of An American in Paris was performed at London's Queen Elizabeth Hall on July 9, 2000, by the City of Oxford Orchestra conducted by Levon Parikian.

William Daly arranged the score for piano solo; this was published by New World Music in 1929.

Preservation status
On September 22, 2013, it was announced that a musicological critical edition of the full orchestral score would be eventually released. The Gershwin family, working in conjunction with the Library of Congress and the University of Michigan, were working to make scores available to the public that represent Gershwin's true intent. It was unknown whether the critical score would include the four minutes of material Gershwin later deleted from the work (such as the restatement of the blues theme after the faster 12 bar blues section), or if the score would document changes in the orchestration during Gershwin's composition process.

The score to An American in Paris was scheduled to be issued first in a series of scores to be released. The entire project was expected to take 30 to 40 years to complete, but An American in Paris was planned to be an early volume in the series.

Two urtext editions of the work were published by the German publisher B-Note Music in 2015. The changes made by Campbell-Watson were withdrawn in both editions. In the extended urtext, 120 bars of music were re-integrated. Conductor Walter Damrosch had cut them shortly before the first performance.

On September 9, 2017, The Cincinnati Symphony Orchestra gave the world premiere of the long-awaited critical edition of the piece prepared by Mark Clague, director of the Gershwin initiative at the University of Michigan. This performance was of the original 1928 orchestration.

Recordings
An American in Paris has been frequently recorded. The first recording was made for the Victor Talking Machine Company in 1929 with Nathaniel Shilkret conducting the Victor Symphony Orchestra, drawn from members of the Philadelphia Orchestra. Gershwin was on hand to "supervise" the recording; however, Shilkret was reported to be in charge and eventually asked the composer to leave the recording studio. Then, a little later, Shilkret discovered there was no one to play the brief celesta solo during the slow section, so he hastily asked Gershwin if he might play the solo; Gershwin said he could and so he briefly participated in the actual recording. This recording is believed to use the taxi horns in the way that Gershwin had intended using the notes A-flat, B-flat, a higher D, and a lower A.

The radio broadcast of the September 8, 1937, Hollywood Bowl George Gershwin Memorial Concert, in which An American in Paris, also conducted by Shilkret, was second on the program, was recorded and was released in 1998 in a two-CD set.

Arthur Fiedler and the Boston Pops Orchestra recorded the work for RCA Victor, including one of the first stereo recordings of the music.

In 1945, Arturo Toscanini conducting the NBC Symphony Orchestra recorded the piece for RCA Victor, one of the few commercial recordings Toscanini made of music by an American composer.

The Seattle Symphony also recorded a version in 1990 of Gershwin's original score, before he made numerous edits resulting in the score as we hear it today.

Harry James released a version of the blues section on his 1953 album One Night Stand, recorded live at the Aragon Ballroom in Chicago (Columbia GL 522 and CL 522).

Use in film
In 1951, Metro-Goldwyn-Mayer released the musical film, An American in Paris, featuring Gene Kelly and Leslie Caron. Winning the 1951 Best Picture Oscar, and numerous other awards, the film was directed by Vincente Minnelli, featured many tunes of Gershwin, and concluded with an extensive, elaborate dance sequence built around the An American in Paris symphonic poem (arranged for the film by Johnny Green), costing $500,000.

References

Further reading
 Rimler, Walter. George Gershwin – An Intimate Portrait. Urbana, University of Illinois Press, 2009. chapter 6: Paris, pp. 28–33.

External links 

 
 Scores, marked by Leonard Bernstein, Andre Kostelanetz, Erich Leinsdorf; New York Philharmonic archives
 1944 recording by the New York Philharmonic conducted by Artur Rodziński
 , New York Philharmonic, Leonard Bernstein, 1959. 

1928 compositions
Compositions by George Gershwin
Grammy Hall of Fame Award recipients
Music about Paris
Music commissioned by the New York Philharmonic
Symphonic poems